State Route 137 (SR 137) is a primary state highway in the U.S. state of Virginia.  The state highway runs  from SR 40 in Kenbridge east to SR 46 at Danieltown.  SR 137 runs concurrently with SR 138 in eastern Lunenburg County and connects Kenbridge with SR 46, the main north–south highway of Brunswick County.

Route description

SR 137 begins at an intersection with SR 40 (Broad Street) in the town of Kenbridge.  This intersection is also the northern terminus of SR 138, which runs concurrently with SR 137 southeast along 5th Avenue.  The two highways exit the town as Dundas Road, which curves to the south and crosses over an abandoned railroad grade.  At Lafoons Corner, SR 138 continues south as South Hill Road toward South Hill while SR 137 turns east to remain on Dundas Road.  The state highway crosses over the former rail line again, then turns right at SR 645 (Jonesboro Road) to remain on Dundas Road, which parallels the abandoned rail line to the hamlet of Dundas.  SR 137 turns south at the northern segment of SR 603 (Potts Spring Road), intersects the former rail line, and turns east again at the southern segment of SR 603 (Mill Pond Road).  East of Dundas, the state highway crosses the Lunenburg–Brunswick county line.  SR 137 continues on Danieltown Road to its eastern terminus at SR 46 (Christanna Highway) at the hamlet of Danieltown.

Major intersections

References

External links

Virginia Highways Project: VA 137

137
State Route 137
State Route 137